Vagelos may refer to:

P. Roy Vagelos of Merck
Vagelos Scholars Program In Molecular Life Sciences